"With You" is a song by American singer-songwriter Mariah Carey from her fifteenth studio album, Caution (2018). On October 4, 2018, Epic Records released it as the album's lead single. The song was written by Carey, Charles Hinshaw, Dijon McFarlane and Greg Lawary, with Carey and DJ Mustard also producing it. The song was announced on October 2, along with its single artwork. A "velvety" ballad with a finger-snap beat and warm piano, the song's lyrics center around a woman seeking safety and security and her partner promising his love.

"With You" received positive reviews from critics. It reached the top 10 in Hungary, and peaked at number seven on the US Adult Contemporary chart. The accompanying music video, directed by Sarah McColgan, was released on October 10, 2018. Its black and white visuals feature Carey creating a sense of intimacy, while highlighting her lush life by posing in different spots across Los Angeles. The song was performed live at the American Music Awards of 2018.

Background and composition

DJ Mustard and Carey produced "With You" and co-wrote it with Charles Hinshaw and Greg Lawary over a two day period at Westlake Recording Studios, Los Angeles. In reference to working with the singer, Lawary stated "When I saw my name among Mariah Carey and DJ Mustard, I teared up. She's such a legend. It's like working with Michael Jackson and Whitney Houston. She's done so much for music". The song was announced on October 2, 2018, along with its single artwork. It was released two days later. "With You" served as the second single from Carey's fifteenth studio album Caution, and was preceded by the promotional single "GTFO".

The song is a "velvety" ballad with a finger-snap beat and warm piano. It features lyrics about a woman seeking safety and security and her partner promising his love. The song's outro features one of Carey's signature high-tone whistle notes. "With You" is centered around Carey telling someone she “fucks with" them in a romantic capacity. It includes a reference to her 1998 single "Breakdown" featuring Bone Thugs-n-Harmony, with her singing "Ever since that Bone Thugs song, you ain't gotta break down, you're too strong". Some critics viewed the song as reminiscent of Carey's earlier work, including the songs: "I Stay in Love", "Bye Bye", and "Angels Cry". It is performed in the key of A major with a tempo of 74 beats per minute in common time. "With You" follows a chord progression of A – C/G – Fm – Em – D – E, and Carey's vocals span from E3 to E7.

Critical reception
"With You" received positive reviews from critics. The Atlantics Spencer Kornhaber praised "With You", stating that he "can’t stop playing" it, and opined that Carey "regards romance with open-eyed caginess". Writing for Rolling Stone, Brittany Spanos called the song a "shchmaltzy slow jam", and made note of the singer's use of the whistle register. Chris DeVille of Stereogum described it as "a different sort of ballad: warm, organic, built from little more than gospel piano and booming 808s", adding "When she leans into the hook, [...], you feel that too". Critics for Jezebel wrote "she will have you know that she is Mariah the star", but added that it is "not super exciting stuff".

Accolades

Commercial performance
"With You" was Carey's first lead single to not enter the US Billboard Hot 100, but it peaked at number seven on the Adult Contemporary chart, giving Carey her 23rd top-ten hit and becoming her highest-charting non-holiday song on the chart since "We Belong Together" in 2005. It also became Carey's 14th top-ten hit on the Adult R&B Songs chart, peaking at number three and giving Carey her highest-charting song on the chart since "Fly Like a Bird" in 2006. Additionally, the song peaked at number 33 on the Adult Top 40 chart, and number 21 on the R&B/Hip-Hop Airplay chart.

Outside the US, the song reached number 125 on the France Downloads chart, and number 30 on Spain's Physical/Digital chart respectively. The highest peak of the song was number eight on the Hungarian Single Top 40 chart. It was Carey's most successful single in Hungary since "I Want to Know What Love Is" in 2009.

Music video
The accompanying music video for "With You" was directed by Sarah McColgan. Its release was teased by Carey a day prior to the premiere via her YouTube channel on October 10, 2018. The video is set in black and white and features Carey creating a sense of intimacy while highlighting her lush life by posing in different spots across Los Angeles. It includes the singer posing at various locations such as a balcony, a beach and the floor of a mansion; she is also seen driving around the city in a car and walking down the Hollywood Boulevard. The outfit worn by Carey consists of a faux fur coat and sunglasses.

Live performances
Carey performed "With You" for the first time at the American Music Awards of 2018. During the performance, she wore a hot pink gown, and was surrounded by shirtless male dancers who performed intricate choreography. While performing, Carey was raised on a pink platform which appeared to be part of her gown. The singer stood in one place throughout the entire performance while dancers mimicking a flower executed choreography around her, and she concluded it by blowing a kiss to the audience. Carey later performed the song on selected dates of her Live in Concert tour. On November 19, 2018, Carey performed "With You" on Good Morning America. It was included in the setlist for her Caution World Tour (2019), serving as part of the encore.

Credits and personnel
Credits are referenced from the album's liner notes.
 Mariah Carey – songwriting, lead vocals, production
 DJ Mustard – songwriting, production
 Greg Lawary – songwriting
 Charles Hinshaw – songwriting
 Chris Gehringer – mastering
 Brian Garten – mixing, recording
 Phil Tan – mixing
 Bill Zimmerman – engineering
 Will Quinnell – engineering
 Jeremy Nichols – engineering

Track listings and formats
Digital download

 "With You" – 3:47

Promotional CD single

 "With You" (Radio Edit) – 3:47
 "With You" (Clean) – 3:47
 "With You" (Main) – 3:47
 "With You" (Instrumental) – 3:47

Charts

Weekly charts

Year-end charts

Release history

References

2018 singles
2018 songs
Mariah Carey songs
2010s ballads
Songs written by Mariah Carey
Songs written by Mustard (record producer)
Song recordings produced by Mustard (record producer)
Song recordings produced by Mariah Carey
Contemporary R&B ballads